Helms Creek is a tributary of the North Fork Kings River in Fresno County, California. The stream drains a remote mountainous part of the Sierra National Forest. The Courtright Dam on Helms Creek forms the  Courtright Reservoir, which is the upper reservoir for the Helms Pumped Storage Plant.

References

Rivers of Northern California
Rivers of Fresno County, California